The Wrest Point Hotel Casino is a casino in Tasmania. It was Australia's first legal casino, opening in the suburb of Sandy Bay in Hobart, on 10 February 1973.

History
Historically, Dunkley's Point was a camping ground held by the semi-nomadic Mouheneener people, who held a permanent settlement at nearby Long Beach called kreewer. Following the British colonisation of Tasmania, Norfolk Islander Thomas Chaffey constructed his residence on the point between 1808 – 1813, which by the end of his life was known as Chaffey's Point. The Traveller's Wrest Hotel, which is still standing today on Sandy Bay Road, was erected by his son William Chaffey in 1836. David Dunkley purchased the Chaffey's Point estate from William Chaffey in 1847. He constructed his residence, St. Helena and renamed the area Dunkley's Point. George G. Robertson purchased St. Helena in 1898 and rebuilt it, adding a jetty and a boat house. Mrs. G. Minette Lucas purchased the estate in 1928 and erected her mansion, known as Wrest Point. The estate was purchased by Arthur Drysdale in 1936.

Granting of the casino licence
The Wrest Point Riviera Hotel was designed by architect Keith Wildman and built by Arthur Drysdale, opening 5 December 1939 on the site of the current Wrest Point Casino. During World War II the hotel was "booming" and the hotel was sold to Australia's oldest hotel group, Federal Hotels, in March 1956.

In the 1960s, The Federal Group attempted to secure Australia's first casino license. At the time, Tasmania's natural scenery and beauty were not widely known elsewhere, and as a result the state wasn't attracting many tourists. The marketing claim was that a casino could be the draw-card that would kick-start Tasmania's tourism industry.

John Haddad, one of the company's executives at the time, was assigned the role of getting a casino license.  He met with then Tasmanian Premier Eric Reece and other state officials.

A state referendum was held to determine the granting of a gambling licence. The polls were very tight, especially since the question in the referendum attempted to minimise the gambling aspect of the development.

Shortly before the referendum was to be held, the Labor party, sensing they had the numbers in the parliament pushed through the legislation to legalise the casino. They did not wait for the results of the vote. When the vote was taken the hotel redevelopment was narrowly passed. Questions have since been raised about how the legislation was passed, with one member of parliament,  Kevin Lyons, suspected of accepting bribes over the licence.

Development
The development of the casino included the construction of the 17-storey hotel tower, with a revolving restaurant, designed by Sir Roy Grounds, a landmark that is nationally identified with Hobart, and the 64-metre dodecagonal prism tower remains the city's tallest building.

After the centre's opening in 1973 (after which it was known as Wrest Point Hotel Casino) the casino provided a catalyst for the nation's casino industry, with 12 additional casinos opening across the country.  This included a second Federal Group casino in Tasmania, the Country Club Casino, which opened in Launceston in 1982.

The building has been extended in recent years, including the conference centre which was opened in 1984, and the boardwalk in 1996. 

Wrest Point underwent an extensive multi-year redevelopment that began in 2018, including new restaurants, gaming areas, and the refurbishment of accommodation.

Controversy 
While initially the hotel was supposed to be an entertainment complex, the casino soon took over much of the hotel; and, while the poker machines were initially not permitted, by executing successful lobbying, they now come to dominate the complex, with over 650 machines.

The owners of the hotel and the poker machines, Federal Hotels, were fined on a number of occasions for poker machines that were not functioning as programmed, and were thus in breach of the law.

In 2017, the building was protected with a heritage listing. While some saw this as significant, the decision "angered local residents and puzzled some experts."

2018 Tasmanian election 
In the 2018 election, the opposition leader, Rebecca White, promised to remove all pokies from pubs and clubs, leaving the two casinos as the only location for pokies in the state, citing the negative health and economic impacts of poker machines. The Federal Group, who own both the casinos and the pokies licences have opposed the policy as have the Liberal government.

Gallery

See also
 1968 Tasmanian casino referendum
 Federal Group
 List of tallest buildings in Hobart

References

External links
Wrest Point Hotel Casino official site
Tourism Tasmania article

Hotel buildings completed in 1939
Casinos completed in 1973
Hotel buildings completed in 1973
Landmarks in Hobart
Hotels in Hobart
Restaurants in Hobart
Casinos in Australia
Buildings and structures with revolving restaurants
Culture in Hobart
Tourist attractions in Hobart
Casino hotels
Sandy Bay, Hobart
1973 establishments in Australia